The pearl-bordered fritillary (Boloria euphrosyne) is a butterfly of the family Nymphalidae found in Europe and through Russia across the Palearctic to the north of Kazakhstan.

Description 
The adult butterfly is orange with black spots on the upperside of its wing and has a wingspan of 38–46 mm. The underside of the wings have a row of silver-pearly markings along the edge, which give the species its name. The pearl-bordered fritillary is often confused with the small pearl-bordered fritillary, but can be distinguished by the triangle along its pearl border (the small pearl-bordered has black chevrons) as well as the presence of a single silver spot in the middle of a row of yellow spots. The female has darker markings and rounder wings than the male. The caterpillars are black with white or yellow spines along their backs.

Like other species of fritillary, the males have special scent glands on their wings so that they can be recognised by females of their own species and therefore find a suitable partner.

Description in Seitz 
A. euphrosyne L. (= niobe Mull.) (67h). Very similar to the preceding species , especially selene, but brighter red and the black markings thinner in typical specimens. Easily recognized by the hindwing beneath, which is bright brick-red at the base, not brown as in selene, the median band bearing only one silver-spot (across the apex of the cell) and the incomplete silvery band in the distal area being replaced by some yellow smears without any silvery gloss. The silvery marginal spots of the hindwing beneath are but very rarely
absent.

Distribution
The pearl-bordered fritillary is widespread throughout Europe, ranging from Scandinavia to northern Spain and from Ireland eastwards across the Palearctic to Russia and to the north of Kazakhstan. In England and Wales (plus another 10 countries) it has declined rapidly in number and is a highly threatened species.

Subspecies
B. e. euphrosyne – Central Europe, Siberia
B. e. fingal (Herbst, 1804) – Northern Europe, Siberia
B. e. rusalka (Fruhstorfer, 1909) – Southern Europe, West Siberia
B. e. orphana (Fruhstorfer, 1907) – Transbaikalia, Amur, Ussuri
B. e. kamtschadalus (Seitz, [1909]) – Kamchatka, North Sakhalin
B. e. umbra (Seitz, [1909]) – Altai, Sayan
B. e. dagestanica (Sovinsky, 1905) – Caucasus, Transcaucasia
B. e. nephele (Herrich-Schäffer, [1847]) – Urals, Siberia

Lifecycle

Food plants and eggs
After mating, the female will lay her eggs on dead bracken (Pteridium aquilinum), or leaf litter near to violet plants – common dog–violet (Viola riviniana), heath dog–violet (Viola canina) or marsh violet (Viola palustris).  Sometimes eggs are laid on the leaves of the food plant itself.  They are laid singly, not in one large group such as the marsh fritillary. The habitat mosaics they prefer are typically one–third grass and two–thirds bracken.

Eggs can be found on the food plant from mid–May to the end of June. They are a pale yellow and can hatch after 10–14 days.

Caterpillar, pupa, and adult
The emerging caterpillars begin feeding immediately and will moult three times within the first 5–6 weeks. Each caterpillar will then hibernate in a shriveled leaf at the base of the plant, usually moving to the hibernation site at the end of July. The caterpillars lose half of their body mass by the time the emerge in the following March. After a period of feeding and growth, during which it moults one last time, the caterpillar is full size and ready to pupate. The chrysalis stage is formed among the leaf litter, and lasts just 10–14 days.

The adult butterfly flies between late April and June, and is one of the earliest fritillaries to emerge. Adults feed on the nectar from early spring flowers such as bugle, dandelion, and lesser celandine.

There is a second brood during August.

Habitat
 Woodland clearings, recently coppiced or clear-felled, with bracken, or leaf litter provided by oak and bramble
 Well-drained habitats with mosaics of grass, bracken, and light scrub
 Hot and freshly cut material
 Abundant food plants growing in short, sparse vegetation, where there is abundant dead plant material, bracken is preferred
 Scrub edges can provide good breeding conditions, e.g. gorse

Management
 A network of paths running through bracken to open the canopy, allows sunlight through to help germinate any violet food plants.  This can be achieved through grazing especially during winter and early spring.  Cattle are better than sheep as their extra weight helps to trample and break up any dense standing dead stems.  Also there is a risk that sheep tend to eat plants, (for example Ajuga reptans/bugle), that provide nectar for the adult pearl-bordered fritillary. Another way of achieving this is by cutting and bruising the bracken, a proportion of the site at a time, during May and early June.
 Burning can be useful for reducing the litter of bracken, although follow up management is required as extra bracken growth will be stimulated as a result.  This will kill a proportion of invertebrates, and therefore only burning a proportion of the site, e.g., 20% is suggested.
 Spraying can be useful for reducing high densities of bracken litter, but care should be taken to not severely reduce the density and allow the grass to develop, as this will harm the breeding habitat.
 Woodlands create sunny clearings and rides, but avoid using clearings that are dominated by other plants such as dog's mercury (Mercurialis perennis), common bluebell, and vigorous grasses.

Example sites where found
 Stansted Park, West Sussex, UK 
Haldon Forest, Devon, UK
Lambert's Castle Hill, Dorset, UK
 Hard Hills, Cornwall, UK grid ref SS 235176
 Ireland

References

External links
Butterfly Conservation Organisation description
UK Butterflies organisation description
UK BAP website
 'Grounded' Devon Wildlife Trust Newsletter
 Bracken for Butterflies by Butterfly Conservation

Boloria
Butterflies of Asia
Butterflies of Europe
Butterflies described in 1758
Taxa named by Carl Linnaeus